Tomás Alva Edison School (TAE) is a private school in Colonia Del Valle, Benito Juárez, Mexico City. Serving grades PreK-12, it occupies four campuses, with one each for preschool, elementary school, middle school, and senior high school. Established in 1983, it originally had 110 students. As of the 2015–2016 school year it had 1,991 students.

References

External links
 Tomás Alva Edison School—

Benito Juárez, Mexico City
High schools in Mexico City
Private schools in Mexico
1983 establishments in Mexico
Educational institutions established in 1983